Ulf Berendt (11 July 1930 – 12 May 1998) was a Swedish figure skater. He competed in the pairs event at the 1952 Winter Olympics.

References

1930 births
1998 deaths
Swedish male pair skaters
Olympic figure skaters of Sweden
Figure skaters at the 1952 Winter Olympics
Sportspeople from Helsingborg